Enzo Serrano (born 19 January 1998) is an Argentine professional footballer who plays as a midfielder for Central Norte.

Career
Serrano began his career with Gimnasia y Esgrima. He made his first appearances during the 2016–17 Primera B Nacional season under Mario Sciacqua, starting fixtures against Atlético Paraná and Brown; his final match of the season versus Instituto saw him receive his first senior red card. Serrano made twenty appearances across his opening two campaigns with the club.

Career statistics
.

References

External links

1998 births
Living people
Sportspeople from Jujuy Province
Argentine footballers
Association football midfielders
Primera Nacional players
Gimnasia y Esgrima de Jujuy footballers
Estudiantes de Buenos Aires footballers
Club Atlético Colegiales (Argentina) players
Central Norte players